Cedarvale, also known as Minskinish, is an unincorporated community in the Skeena River valley of northwestern British Columbia, Canada.  Located originally on the west side of the Skeena as a railway station of the Grand Trunk Pacific Railway and nearby post office, in 1910, Cedarvale is now on the east side of the river along the Yellowhead Highway.  The community's name in the Tsimshian language is Minskinish, meaning "under the pitch pines", which began as a missionary settlement similar in character to but much smaller than Metlakatla.  The Indian reserve comprising the community is Koonwat Indian Reserve No. 7.
This settlement began as Minskinish, a Victorian missionary village like William Duncan's Metlakatla. The benevolent despot here was the Reverend R. Tomlinson, who founded the village in 1888. The Sabbath was strictly observed in Minskinish; no work of any sort was done on Sunday, no visitor arrived or departed, and if a river boat arrived that day it merely left the mail on the bank of the Skeena, where it was not touched until Monday. It is not surprising that the village was nicknamed "Holy City". Minskinish means "under the pitch pines". Its present name of Cedarvale comes from the cedars which grow around the landing.

The Cedarvale railway station is served by Via Rails Jasper – Prince Rupert train.

Climate
Cedarvale has a humid continental climate (Köppen climate classification Dfb) with cold, snowy winters and warm summers.

References

Unincorporated settlements in British Columbia
Skeena Country